This is a list of women writers who were born in Iran or whose writings are closely associated with that country.

A
Masoumeh Abad (born 1962), activist, politician, and non-fiction author
Janet Afary (born 1960), feminist, historian, non-fiction writer
Mahnaz Afkhami (born 1941), feminist, non-fiction writer, now in the United States
Pegah Ahmadi (born 1974), poet, critic, translator
Mahshid Amirshahi (born 1937), novelist, short story writer, critic, journalist, translator
Jaleh Amouzgar (born 1939), linguist, anthropologist, academic
Akram Monfared Arya (born 1946), pilot, poet, short story writer, artist, now living in Sweden, writes in Persian, Swedish and English
Lady Amin (1886–1983), mystic, author of works on Islamic sciences
Mahshid Amirshahi (born 1937), novelist, short story writer, critic, journalist, translator
Noushafarin Ansari (born 1939), librarian, educator, journalist
Mastoureh Ardalan (1805–1848), Kurdish poet, philosopher, historian
Mina Assadi (born 1943), poet, journalist, living in Sweden
Bibi Khanoom Astarabadi (c.1858–1921), feminist, literary historian
Ghazaleh Alizadeh (born 1947), writer, poet

B
Rakhshan Bani-E'temad (born 1954), film director, screenwriter
Najmieh Batmanglij (born 1957), Iranian-American cookbook writer
Simin Behbahani (1927–2014), acclaimed poet
Niloofar Beyzaie (born 1967), playwright, theatre director, living in German
Taraneh Boroumand playwright, writer, poet, translator

D
Simin Daneshvar (1921–2012), acclaimed early female novelist, short story writer, translator, educator
Soraya Darabi (born 1955), journalist, trade union activist
Sahar Delijani (born 1983), widely translated novelist, author of Children of the Jacaranda Tree, living between the United States and Italy
Sediqeh Dowlatabadi (1882–1961), feminist, journalist
Firoozeh Dumas (born 1965), Iranian-American memoirist, humorous writer, author of Funny in Farsi

E
Shirin Ebadi (born 1947), Nobel peace prize winner, human rights activist, non-fiction writer
Amanda Enayati (born 1967), columnist, communication strategist
Camelia Entekhabifard (born 1973), poet, journalist, memoirist, living in the United States
Parvin E'tesami (1907–1941), acclaimed classical poet, essayist
Mansoureh Ettehadieh (graduated 1956), historian, educator, non-fiction writer, novelist

F
Forough Farrokhzad (1935–1967), influential poet, film director, poetry translated into several languages including English
Pooran Farrokhzad, since the 1990s: poet, playwright, encyclopedist
Nazila Fathi (born 1970), author and Iranian correspondent for The New York Times

G
Zarah Ghahramani (born 1981), Iranian-born Australian memoirist, author of My Life as a Traitor
Shusha Guppy (1935–2008), singer, memoirist, writer, critic, journal editor; she lived in London

H
Fattaneh Haj Seyed Javadi (born 1945), best selling novelist
Roya Hakakian (born 1966), Iranian-American poet, journalist, memoirist, essayist, television producer
Maryam Heydarzadeh (born 1977), poet, lyricist
Maryam Hooleh (born 1978), poet, novelist, filmmaker

J
Rosa Jamali (born 1977), poet, playwright, translator

K
Sheema Kalbasi (born 1972), widely translated poet, human rights activist, living in the United States
Mehrangiz Kar (born 1944), women's rights activist, essayist, author of Crossing the Red Line
Persis Karim (born 1962), literature scholar, author, and professor; director of the Center for Iranian Diaspora Studies at San Francisco State University; lives in the San Francisco Bay Area.
Leila Kasra (1939–1989), poet, lyricist
Fatemeh Keshavarz (born 1952), poet, educator, literary historian, living in the United States
Porochista Khakpour (born 1978), Iranian-American novelist, essayist

L
Shahla Lahiji (born 1942), feminist, translator, publisher

M
Mahsati (c.1089–c.1159), early Persian poet writing in quatrains
Marsha Mehran (1977–2014), widely translated novelist, author of Pomegranate Soup; she lived in Argentina, the United States, Australia and Ireland.
Mozhgan Babamarandi is an eminent Iranian writer best known for children and young adult fiction, since 1996
Farzaneh Milani, Iranian-American educator, since early 1990s: non-fiction writer, poet
Azadeh Moaveni (born 1976), Iranian-American journalist, memoirist, author of Lipstick Jihad, now living in London
Roza Montazemi (c.1921–2009), popular cookbook writer
Minoo Moshiri, essayist, translator and journalist 
Granaz Moussavi (born 1976), Iranian-Australian poet, screenwriter, film director

N
Azar Nafisi (born 1955), feminist, memoirist, literary critic, author of Reading Lolita in Tehran
Afsaneh Najmabadi (born 1946), Iranian-American historian, educator, literary historian, author of The Story of the Daughters of Quchan
Marina Nemat (born 1965), memoirist

O
Ghazal Omid, memoirist, author of A True Odyssey of a Woman's Struggle in Islamic Iran Against Personal and Political Forces (2005)

P
Shahrnush Parsipur (born 1946), novelist, short story writer, children's writer, translator
Zoya Pirzad (born 1952), Iranian-Armenian novelist, works translated into several languages

S
Sepideh Shamlou (born 1968), writer
Shadi Sadr (born 1974), lawyer, journalist, women's rights activist
Nazi Safavi (born 1967), novelist, author of Hallway to Paradise
Tahereh Saffarzadeh (born 1936), poet, non-fiction writer, translator, educator
Parinoush Saniee, since 2003, novelist, author of the widely translated The Book of Fate
Homa Sarshar, Iranian-American author, activist, feminist and journalist
Marjane Satrapi (born 1969), Iranian-born French novelist, illustrator, children's writer
Louisa Shafia, Iranian-American chef and cookbook writer
Mahasti Shahrokhi (born 1956), novelist, poet
Siba Shakib, novelist, filmmaker, author of the widely translated Afghanistan, Where God Only Comes to Weep (2002)
Shahla Sherkat (born 1956), journalist, feminist writer, journal publisher
Zandokht Shirazi (1900–1953), feminist, poet, educator
Marzieh Sotoudeh (born 1957), Iranian-Canadian short story writer, translator

T
Táhirih, pseudonym of Fatimah Baraghani (c.1814–1852), poet, theologian
Goli Taraghi (born 1939), novelist, short story writer
 Tahereh Eybod, author, researcher, and critic and journalist, known for her children's literature.
Niloufar Talebi, memoirist, nonfiction writer, literary translator, multidisciplinary artist

V
Fariba Vafi (born 1963), novelist
Lobat Vala (born 1930), poet, feminist, now living in London

Y
Chista Yasrebi (born 1968), writer, literary critic, translator, publisher
Elham Yaghoubian, since the 1990s: novelist, living in the United States

See also
List of women writers

References

-
Iranian women writers, List of
Writers
Women writers, List of Iranian